The 2011–12 Football League Championship (known as the npower Championship for sponsorship reasons) was the eighth season of the league under its current title and nineteenth season under its current league division format.

Reading secured the Championship title on 21 April, following second-placed Southampton's 2–1 defeat to Middlesbrough. The result left Southampton four points behind Reading with only one game remaining. Southampton were promoted on the final day of the season, after winning 4–0 at home to Coventry City, who were one of three teams relegated along with Portsmouth (who were deducted ten points midway through the season for entering administration) and Doncaster Rovers. West Ham United occupied the final promotion place as they returned to the Premier League after just one year. West Ham beat Blackpool in the Play-off final at Wembley Stadium, sealing their return to the top division after narrowly missing out on automatic promotion.

Changes from last season

Team changes

From Championship
Promoted to Premier League
 Queens Park Rangers
 Norwich City
 Swansea City

Relegated to League One
 Sheffield United
 Scunthorpe United
 Preston North End

To Championship
Relegated from Premier League

 West Ham United
 Blackpool
 Birmingham City

Promoted from League One
 Brighton & Hove Albion
 Southampton
 Peterborough United

Rule changes
 The Football Association and the Football Association of Wales will now both decide on disciplinary action for Welsh clubs in the Premier League and the Football League.
 Only five substitutes can be named on match days, reduced from last season's seven named substitutes.

Team overview

Stadia and locations

Personnel and sponsoring

Managerial changes

Ownership changes

League table

Play-offs

Results
The fixtures for the Championship were released on 17 June 2011. The season kicked off on 5 August 2011 and concluded on 28 April 2012.

Statistics

Top goalscorers

Top assists

Hat-tricks

 4 Player scored 4 goals

Scoring
 First goal of the season: Gary Taylor-Fletcher for Blackpool against Hull City (5 August 2011)
 Fastest goal of the season: 7 seconds – Ricardo Vaz Tê for Barnsley against Crystal Palace (6 December 2011)
 Latest goal of the season: 98 minutes and 49 seconds – Luciano Becchio for Leeds United against Doncaster Rovers (18 February 2012)
 Most goals in a game: 10 goals
 Leeds United 3–7 Nottingham Forest (20 March 2012)
 Most goals scored in a game by one team: 7 goals – Peterborough United 7–1 Ipswich Town (20 August 2011), Leeds United 3–7 Nottingham Forest (20 March 2012).
 Widest winning margin: 6 goals – Peterborough United 7–1 Ipswich Town (20 August 2011), Millwall 0–6 Birmingham City (14 January 2012), West Ham United 6–0 Brighton & Hove Albion (14 April 2012)
 Widest away winning margin: 6 goals – Millwall 0–6 Birmingham City (14 January 2012)
 Highest scoring draw: 6 goals – Brighton & Hove Albion 3–3 Leeds United (23 September 2011), West Ham United 3–3 Birmingham City (9 April 2012)
 Most games failed to score in: 19 – Nottingham Forest
 Fewest games failed to score in: 6 – Birmingham City

Disciplinary record by team

Source:

 Most yellow cards (player): 12 – Barry Robson (Middlesbrough)
 Most red cards (player): 2 – Neil Danns (Leicester City), Matt Mills (Leicester City), Matt Sparrow (Brighton & Hove Albion), Kevin Thomson (Middlesbrough)

Clean sheets
 Most clean sheets: 20 – Reading
 Fewest clean sheets: 4 – Peterborough United

Monthly awards

Events

Portsmouth administration
On 17 February 2012, Portsmouth entered administration for the second time in three years, incurring a 10-point penalty. Trevor Birch of the accountancy firm Pannell Kerr Forster was appointed administrator of the club.

References

 
EFL Championship seasons
1
2
Eng